Daniel Tavis Romano (born 1985) is a Canadian musician, poet and visual artist based out of his hometown of Welland, Ontario. He is primarily known as a solo artist, though he is also a member of Attack in Black and has collaborated with Julie Doiron and Frederick Squire. He has also produced and performed with City and Colour, the recording project of Dallas Green.

Romano is a partner in his own independent record label, You've Changed Records, along with Steve Lambke, of the Constantines.

Some of his notable visual work includes designs for M. Ward, Ben Kweller, Ladyhawk and City and Colour. A skilled leather craftsman, he has designed and tooled guitar straps for many of his contemporaries (Kathleen Edwards, Bahamas, Travis Good of the Sadies).

The Canadian music magazine Exclaim! has identified five distinct styles in Romano's work: a gentle, rustic folk sound personified by projects such as Daniel, Fred & Julie and Workin' for the Music Man, a retro country style on albums like Sleep Beneath the Willow and If I've Only One Time Askin, straight-ahead rock on Nerveless and How Ill Thy World Is Ordered, psychedelic rock on works like Modern Pressure and Visions of the Higher Dream, and punk rock in his works released under the band name Ancient Shapes.

Romano's 2011 album Sleep Beneath the Willow was a longlisted nominee for the 2011 Polaris Music Prize, and his 2013 album Come Cry With Me was longlisted for the 2013 Polaris Music Prize.

If I've Only One Time Askin''' was nominated for a 2016 Juno Award for Adult Alternative Album of the Year.

On January 4, 2018, Romano released two simultaneous surprise albums, Human Touch and Nerveless.

In 2020, during the COVID-19 pandemic in Canada, Romano released several new albums of both newly recorded and archival material in quick succession. This began with the surprise album Visions of the Higher Dream, which was made available on his Bandcamp page for just $3. He followed up with the live album Okay Wow and the studio album Content to Point the Way, both recorded with his backing band The Outfit; and Super Pollen, a collaborative EP recorded with his brother Ian and Mike Haliechuk and Jonah Falco of Fucked Up. In May, he followed up with Forever Love's Fool, a 22-minute progressive rock track recorded with Danny Carey of the band Tool.

In June 18, 2021, Romano released a live album titled Fully Plugged In. Romano also announced another new album, Cobra Poems, set to release on September 10, 2021. He is also featured on Doiron's 2021 album I Thought of You.

In 2022 and 2023, Romano has appeared at some shows on The Sadies' concert tour to support Colder Streams as a guest guitarist.

Discography
 Solo albums Workin' for the Music Man (2010)Sleep Beneath the Willow (2011)Come Cry With Me (2013)If I've Only One Time Askin' (2015)Mosey (2016)Modern Pressure (2017)Human Touch (2018)Nerveless (2018)Finally Free (2018)Visions of the Higher Dream (2020)Dandelion (2020)White Flag (2020)Kissing the Foe (2021)

 with Daniel Romano's Outfit 
Daniel Romano's Outfit includes David Nardi (guitar), Roddy Rosetti (electric bass), Ian Romano (drums), Juliana Riolino (vocals), and Tony “The Pope” Cicero (organ).Content to Point the Way (2020)Okay Wow (2020)Forever Love's Fool, feat. Danny Carey (2020)Daniel Romano's Outfit Do (What Could Have Been) Infidels By Bob Dylan & the Plugz (2020)How Ill Thy World Is Ordered (2020)Fully Plugged In (2021)Cobra Poems (2021)La Luna (2022)

 with Ancient Shapes Ancient Shapes (2016)Silent Rave (2018)A Flower That Wouldn't Bloom (2019)

 With Steve Lambke as Spider Bite Spider Bite (2020)

 With Kelly Sloan and David Nardi as Alias Ensemble A Splendour of Heart (2020)

 With Frederick Squire and Julie Doiron Daniel, Fred & Julie (2009)

EPsSongs for Misha (2009)Super Pollen'' (2020)

References

External links
Official website

1985 births
Living people
People from Welland
Canadian country singer-songwriters
Canadian indie rock musicians
Canadian male singer-songwriters
Musicians from the Regional Municipality of Niagara
21st-century Canadian male singers
Canadian rock singers